Céline Degrange (born December 29, 1978, Moulins, Allier, France) is a retired French rhythmic gymnast.

At the age of 13 and a half, she competed for France in the individual rhythmic gymnastics all-around competition at the 1992 Olympic Games in Barcelona. She tied for 25th place in the qualification round and didn't advance to the final. She was the youngest in the competition.

References

External links 
 Céline Degrange at Sports-Reference.com

1978 births
Living people
French rhythmic gymnasts
Gymnasts at the 1992 Summer Olympics
Olympic gymnasts of France
Sportspeople from Allier